Luis is a male given name. It can also refer to:

 Luis (letter), the second letter of the Ogham alphabet
 Luis (TV series), a short-lived television sitcom starring Luis Guzmán
 Luis  Muñoz Marín International Airport, main airport in San Juan, Puerto Rico
 Hurricane Luis, one of the deadliest and most destructive hurricanes of the 1995 Atlantic hurricane season